The Kemerovo State University (KemSU) was established in 1973 as a successor to Kemerovo Pedagogical Institute. It is a leading educational and scientific center of Kemerovo Oblast with five branches throughout the oblast in Belovo, Anzhero-Sudzhensk, Novokuznetsk, Prokopyevsk, as well as in Ulaanbaatar in Mongolia. The university is officially recognized by the Ministry of Science and Higher Education of the Russian Federation. Kemerovo State University offers courses and programs in a number of disciplines, including officially recognized higher education degrees such as bachelor's degrees, master's degrees, and doctoral degrees.

Academics
The main campus has 17 educational laboratory and administrative buildings with the total space of 120,000 m². There are 20 departments, 70 chairs. Over 10,000 full-time students. About 21,000 students including part-time. Over 900 faculty members, including: 35 academicians and corresponding members of the Russian Academy of Sciences and other academies; 80 Doctors of Science, professors; 380 candidates of science, senior lecturers. Seventeen persons are awarded "Honored Workers" titles. About 500 post-graduates and doctoral students. Five Councils on Theses.

On average KemSU post-graduate students defend 30-40 Candidate's and 6-8 Doctor's theses in a given year. KemSU holds 6-10 All-Russia and international scientific conferences annually. The annual number of scientific publications runs up to over 1,500, including 600-700 articles in the central press.

The university specializes in rare languages such as the Shor language, and has begun a revival of the regional languages.

Administration
Rectors:
 Alexander Prosekov, 2016–present
 Vladimir Volchek, 2012–2016
 Irina Sviridova, 2007–2012
 Ilia Povarich, 2005–2007 Doctor of Economics
 Boris Nevzorov, 2005– First Vice-rector, Doctor of Pedagogics, Professor, Academician of the International Academy of Science - Higher School
 Yury Zakharov, 1975–2005 PhD Chem., Professor, Corresponding Member of RAS, Academician of IAS HS and RANS, Honored Scientist of the Russian Federation

Branches
Novokuznetsk Branch Kemerovo State University

See also
Education in Russia
Education in Siberia

References

External links
Official website 

Universities in Kemerovo Oblast
Universities and institutes established in the Soviet Union
Educational institutions established in 1973
1973 establishments in Russia